The University of Pittsburgh School of Law (Pitt Law) was founded in 1895.  It became a charter member of the Association of American Law Schools in 1900. Its primary home facility is the Barco Law Building. The school offers four degrees: Master of Studies in Law, Juris Doctor, Master of Laws for international students, and the Doctor of Juridical Science. The school offers several international legal programs, operates a variety of clinics, and publishes several law journals.

According to University of Pittsburgh School of Law's 2016 ABA-required disclosures, 91.4% of graduates were employed ten months after graduation with 68% attaining positions where bar admission is required.

History

The law department was founded in 1843 and is one of 17 schools constituting the University of Pittsburgh. The first four law degrees were conferred in 1847.  Classes were held in a stone building at Third Street until the building was destroyed in the fire of 1845 and were then held in the university's building on Duquesne Way until that building was burned in 1849.  Classes were continued after the second fire in the basement of the Third Presbyterian Church until the universities first law professor, Walter H. Lowrie, was elected to the Supreme Court of Pennsylvania in 1851 and forced him to abandon his teaching at the school. This, along with the fires that destroyed many of the university's facilities and resources, disrupted the development of the School of Law.

Although various attempts were made to reestablish law instruction beginning in 1862, a permanent law school was not established until 1895. The university at that time was named the Western University of Pennsylvania, but despite this, the law school was originally named the Pittsburgh Law School, a name it held until 1918. The Pittsburgh Law School became a charter member of the Association of American Law Schools in 1900.

The first classes in the permanently established school were conducted in the orphans' court rooms in the old Allegheny County courthouse. In 1897, the school moved into the old university building at Ross and Diamond streets that had been sold to the county in 1882. The school moved again in 1919-20 to the tenth floor of the Chamber of Commerce building. In 1936 the School of Law moved in its entirety to the 14-16 floors of the Cathedral of Learning on the main campus of the university located in the Oakland neighborhood of  Pittsburgh. 

During the 1950s and 1960s, the School of Law's Health Law Center was an early pioneer in the field now known as computer-assisted legal research (CALR). Attorney and researcher John Horty was astounded by the extent to which the laws governing hospital administration varied from one state to the next across the United States, and began building a computer database to help him keep track of it all. News of Horty's pioneering work at Pitt inspired the Ohio State Bar Association (just across the state line in nearby Ohio) to create its own separate CALR system, the ancestor of the database system known today as LexisNexis. The School of Law moved into their own dedicated facility, the Barco Law Building, upon its opening on the university's main campus in 1976.

In 2007, one ranking put Pitt's Law School faculty as 21st in the nation based on scholarly impact.  Pitt Law is currently ranked tied for 78th out of 199 in U.S. News & World Reports rankings of America's top law schools and in 2009 was listed among the "Best Law Schools" by The Princeton Review.  Pitt Law is also one of 80 law schools with membership in the Order of the Coif.

Facilities

 Barco Law Building - Pitt Law School is housed in the six-story Barco Law Building on Forbes Avenue, located on the main campus of the University of Pittsburgh.
 Barco Law Library - The Law Library is housed on the third, fourth, and fifth floors of the Barco Law Building. The library was renovated in 2004 , and the current collection numbers some 450,000 volumes and volume equivalents and has a seating capacity, in both the individual carrels and in private reading areas, of over 400. In addition, located within several blocks of the Law Building are Hillman Library, Carnegie Library of Pittsburgh, and several special libraries of the University, including the business, medical, and public and international affairs libraries.
 Teplitz Memorial Moot Courtroom - Located on the ground floor, the moot courtroom, named for the late Benjamin H. Teplitz, includes a seven-seat judges' bench, jury and press boxes, counselors' tables, judges' chambers, and a jury room. It is used primarily by trial tactics classes and by the growing number of moot court programs. It is equipped to handle special sessions of the Commonwealth and Federal Appellate Courts and hearings before various administrative tribunals.
 Other design features of the Law Building include a pedestrian bridge connecting the School of Law with Litchfield Towers dormitories, Lawrence Hall, and Wesley W. Posvar Hall.

Deans of the Law School 
 John Douglass Shafer, 1895–1920
 Alexander Marshall Thompson, 1920–1940
 Eugene Allen Gilmore, 1940–1942
 Judson Adams Crane, 1942–1949
 Charles Bernard Nutting, 1949–1951
 Judson Adams Crane (Acting Dean), 1951–1952
 Brainerd Currie, 1952–1953
 Arthur Larson (on leave of absence 1954–56), 1953–1956
 Charles Wilson Taintor II (Acting Dean), 1954–1957
 Thomas McIntyre Cooley II, 1957–1965
 William Edward Sell, Chairman, Administrative Committee, 1965–1966; Dean, 1966–1977
 John E. Murray Jr., 1977–1984
 Richard J. Pierce Jr., 1984–1985
 Mark A. Nordenberg, 1985–1993 (University Chancellor, 1995–2014)
 Richard H. Seeburger (Interim Dean), 1993–1994
 Peter M. Shane, 1994–1998
 David J. Herring, 1998–2005
 Mary A. Crossley, 2005–2012
 William M. Carter Jr., 2012–2018
 Amy J. Wildermuth, 2018–2023
 Haider Ala Hamoudi (Interim Dean), 2023-Present

Academics
The University of Pittsburgh School of Law offers four degrees. The J.D. (Juris Doctor) is the required degree to practice law in most of the United States, thus J.D. students make up most of the school's student body.

Academic programs

 The John P. Gismondi Civil Litigation Certificate Program
 Environmental Law, Science and Policy
 Health Law
 Intellectual Property and Technology Law
 International and Comparative Law
 Disability Studies
 Law and Entrepreneurship
 Washington, D.C. Externship Program

Pitt Law Center for International Legal Education
Pitt Law offers area studies in the following international legal systems:
 Asian Studies
 Global Studies
 Latin American Studies
 Russia and Eastern European Studies
 Western European Studies

These area studies serve to supplement the study of International Law, in addition to providing Pitt Law students with the opportunity to pursue careers abroad.

Experiential skills programs

Clinics
The University of Pittsburgh School of Law has several clinical programs, which allow law students to gain practical experience as lawyers before graduating from law school. The following clinics are currently offered by the School of Law:
 Tax Clinic
 Securities Arbitration Clinic
 Family Law Clinic
 Environmental Law Clinic
 Health Law Clinic
 Elder Law Clinic
 Immigration Law Clinic

Lawyering Skills Competitions
The law school also hosts and facilitates multiple moot court and lawyering skills competitions for law students. The law school's Moot Court Board administers three intramural competitions each year: the Appellate Moot Court Competition, the Murray S. Love Trial Moot Court Competition, and the Negotiations Competition. The school also assembles teams to compete at multiple interscholastic and international moot court competitions covering specialized areas such as Energy Law, Environmental Law, Health Law, International Arbitration and International Law, Workers' Compensation Law, Client Counseling, and Intellectual Property. The school's Mock Trial Program recruits adjunct coaches from the local practicing bar to assemble law student teams to participate in mock trial competitions throughout the country. In 2014-2015, more than 20% of second- and third-year students participated in an interscholastic competition.

Practicums
The law school has several practicum courses, which aim to combine traditional coursework and instruction with experiential learning under supervising attorneys in various specific interest areas:
Criminal Prosecution Practicum
Education Law Practicum
Health Law Practicum: Alternative Dispute Resolution
Law, Entertainment, and Social Enterprise Practicum
Lawyering Process III Practicum
Pennsylvania Practice Practicum
Medicare and Medicaid Practicum
Social Security Disability Practicum
Unemployment Compensation Practicum	
Veterans Practicum	
Workers' Compensation Practicum

Semester in D.C. Program
The law school's Semester in D.C. Program allows spring semester second- and third-year students to pursue a full-time externship for an employer in Washington, D.C. The Semester in D.C. combines full-time work for academic credit with a small seminar class held at the law school's dedicated Washington Center to fulfill a full semester credit load. Students can also pursue a Public Policy Concentration, taking additional courses to learn to apply legal advocacy, research, and writing skills in the policy context.

Publications

Journals

Pitt Law is home to two law reviews and several student-edited legal journals, including the Pittsburgh Law Review, which is one of the 40 most-cited law reviews in the country, according to Chicago-Kent Law Review's 1996 Faculty Scholarship Survey . The following law reviews are all publications of the University of Pittsburgh School of Law:
 University of Pittsburgh Law Review
 Journal of Law and Commerce

The following journals are all publications of the University of Pittsburgh School of Law:
 Pittsburgh Tax Review
 Pittsburgh Journal of Technology Law & Policy
 Pittsburgh Journal of Environmental and Public Health Law

JURIST
JURIST is the world's only law school-based comprehensive legal news and research service. Its professionally trained staff of law faculty and law students report and research the latest legal developments in real time for members of the legal community and the public at large. JURIST covers legal news stories based on their substantive importance rather than on their mass-market or commercial appeal.

Applicant Information

Admissions
Admissions to the University of Pittsburgh School of Law are conducted on a rolling basis, with an acceptance rate of slightly less than 30%. For the entering class of 2019, the median LSAT score was 158, and the median GPA was 3.49. There were 120 entering students.

Admissions Statistics for the University of Pittsburgh School of Law

Costs and Financial Aid 
The estimated cost of attendance (includes tuition, fees, books, and living expenses) at Pitt Law for the 2014-15 academic year is $50,008 for a Pennsylvania resident and $57,492 for a non-resident. The average law school debt for the graduating Class of 2012 was $94,879, well below the national average.
Pitt Law was one of only 53 law schools out of over 200 nationally (and one of only three in Pennsylvania) to be ranked as a 2014 Best Value by The National Jurist. The survey took into account multiple factors, with success in job placement weighted most heavily at 35%, followed by tuition (25%), average indebtedness (15%), bar passage rates (15%), and cost of living (10%).

Employment

Rankings and Honors

 Pitt Law is ranked tied for 78th by U.S. News & World Report.

Notable alumni

Ruggero J. Aldisert - (1947) - U.S. Court of Appeals for the Third Circuit 1968-1986
Anne X. Alpern - (1927) - first women attorney general for Pennsylvania and first women to serve on the Supreme Court of Pennsylvania
W. Thomas Andrews - (1966) - Pennsylvania State Senator
Pavel Astakhov - (2002) - Children's Ombudsman of Russia (2009–present)
George Barco - (1934) - Cable television executive who played a key role in development of that industry
Yolanda Barco - (1949) -  Cable television executive
Derrick Bell - (1957) - First tenured black professor at Harvard Law School
Homer S. Brown - (1923) - Judge, civil and political rights activist, elected to the Pennsylvania House of Representatives (1934–1950)
Mary Beth Buchanan - (1987) - United States Attorney for Western Pennsylvania (2001–2009) 
Linda Drane Burdick  - (1989) - Chief Assistant State Attorney at the Orange and Osceola County State Attorney's Office in Orlando, Florida. She was the lead prosecutor on the State of Florida vs. Casey Anthony case.
Ralph J. Cappy - (1968) - Justice (1990–2008) and Chief Justice of the Pennsylvania Supreme Court (2003–2008)
Earl Chudoff - (1932) - U.S. Representative (1949–1958)
 Robert J. Cindrich (1968) – former U.S. attorney and US District judge
 Harry W. Colmery (1916) – Author of G.I. Bill.
William Corbett (1927) - 2nd Secretary of Guam (1953–1956) and the 3rd Civilian Governor of Guam (1956)
Harmar D. Denny Jr. - (1911) - U.S. Representative (1951–1953)
Q. Todd Dickinson - (1977) - former Under Secretary of Commerce for Intellectual Property and Director of the United States Patent and Trademark Office (USPTO) (1999–2001); current Executive Director of the American Intellectual Property Law Association (AIPLA)
 Dawne Hickton (1983) – vice chair, President, CEO of RTI International Metals
James H. Duff - (1907) - Pennsylvania Governor (1947–1951), U.S. Senator (1951–1957)
Charles H. Ealy - (1908) - President Pro Tempore of the Pennsylvania Senate (1941–1944)
Harry Allison Estep - (1913) - U.S. Representative (1927–1933)
Lucy Fato - (1991) - Corporate attorney, general counsel of AIG (2017–present)
Anne Feeney - (1978) - folk musician, political activist and attorney
Tom Feeney - (1983) - U.S. Representative (2003–2009)
Melissa Hart - (1987) - U.S. Representative (2001–2007)
 Orrin Hatch - (1962) - President Pro Tempore of the U.S. Senate and U.S. Senator (1977–2019) 
 David J. Hickton - (1981) – staff director and senior counsel to the House Select Subcommittee on the Coronavirus Crisis, former U.S. Attorney for the Western District of Pennsylvania, director and founder of the University of Pittsburgh Institute for Cyber Law, Policy and Security
Mark R. Hornak - (1981) - Chief Judge for the United States District Court for the Western District of Pennsylvania (2011–present)
K. Leroy Irvis - (1953) - First African American to serve as a speaker of the house (Pennsylvania) in any state legislature in the United States since Reconstruction.
William Lerach - (1970) - Retired notable private securities class action attorney 
Roslyn Litman, who successfully sued the NBA on behalf of blackballed player Connie Hawkins. 
Susan Richard Nelson - (1978) - Judge for the United States District Court for the District of Minnesota
Maryellen Noreika - (1993) - Judge for the United States District Court for the District of Delaware
Dan Onorato - (1989) - Chief executive of Allegheny County (2003–2012)
Vjosa Osmani (LLM 2005, SJD 2015) - 5th President of Kosovo (2021–present)
David A. Reed - (1903) - U.S. Senator (1922–1935)
Edgar Snyder - (1966) - Prominent personal injury attorney, Pennsylvania "Super Lawyer" 
Sara Soffel - (1916) - Judge, Allegheny County Court and Pennsylvania Courts of Common Pleas; first woman to serve as a judge in Pennsylvania. 
Joseph H. Thompson (1908) - Medal of Honor Recipient, College Football Hall of Fame player and coach, Pennsylvania State Senator (1913–16)
Dick Thornburgh - (1957) - Pennsylvania Governor (1979–1987), U.S. Attorney General (1988–1991)
Debra Todd - (1982) - Justice on the Pennsylvania Supreme Court (2007–present)
Cyril Wecht - (1962) - American forensic pathologist
Joseph F. Weis Jr. - (1950) - U.S. Court of Appeals for the Third Circuit (1973-1988)
Mary Jo White - (1967) - Pennsylvania State Senator
James A. Wright - (1927) - U.S. Representative (1941–1945)
Joseph "Chip" Yablonski - (1965) - Attorney, NFL Players Association; son of murdered labor leader Joseph Yablonski

Notes

External links
 

Law, School of
University of Pittsburgh School of Law
Educational institutions established in 1895
1895 establishments in Pennsylvania